Nuka can mean:

 Younger sibling of the speaker's sex (younger brother or younger sister) in the Inuit language. Nuka is widely used as a personal name for females and males in Greenland. In Canadian Inuktitut as well as Alaskan Iñupiaq and Yupik (all branches of the Inuit language), the form Nukaq is used, and is used more as a designation for younger sibling in these dialects.
 The Japanese word for rice bran

Places
Nuka Island, an island in the northern Gulf of Alaska in Kenai Peninsula Borough, Alaska, United States
Nuka, Kiribati, a settlement in Kiribati
Nuka Formation, a geologic formation in Alaska

People
Nuka (beat maker) (born 2000/2001), New Caledonian beat maker and record producer known for producing Jason Derulo's 2020 single "Love Not War (The Tampa Beat)"
Anushka Manchanda (born 1984), singer, songwriter, and producer also known by her musical alias Nuka
Nuka Taipari (? – 1863), New Zealand tribal leader, warrior and tohunga

Fictional characters
 A character in Astro Boy, a female robot on whom Astro has a crush
 Nuka (The Lion King), a character from the 1998 Disney direct-to-video animated film The Lion King II: Simba's Pride

See also
 Fallout 4: Nuka-World, a video game extension pack